Origin PC Corp. is a custom personal computer manufacturing company located in Miami, Florida.  Founded by former Alienware employees in 2009, Origin PC assembles high-performance gaming and professional-use desktop and laptop computers from third-party components.

History
Soon after the acquisition of Alienware by Dell, former executives Kevin Wasielewski, Richard Cary, and Hector Penton formed Origin PC in Miami, Florida. The company states that the name Origin came from the company's intention to get back to the roots of building custom, high-performance computers for gamers and hardware enthusiasts. Origin PC's first products were the GENESIS desktop and the EON18 laptop. In 2014, Origin PC announced a new line of EVO series laptops.

On January 7, 2014, at CES, Origin PC announced and launched Genesis (Full-Tower) and Millennium (Mid-Tower) desktop case.

In July 2019, Corsair Components, Inc. announced its acquisition of Origin PC Corp.

Hardware
Origin gaming laptops are based upon the Clevo whitebox notebook chassis.

See also

List of computer system manufacturers

References

External links
 

Computer companies established in 2009
Computer companies of the United States
Manufacturing companies based in Miami
Privately held companies based in Florida
2009 establishments in Florida
Gaming computers
Computer enclosure companies
2019 mergers and acquisitions